Schistophleps hyalina is a moth in the subfamily Arctiinae. It was described by George Thomas Bethune-Baker in 1908. It is found in New Guinea.

References

Natural History Museum Lepidoptera generic names catalog

Moths described in 1908
Nudariina